Livadiya was an urban-type settlement in Primorsky Krai, Russia, located on the west coast of Vostok Bay.  On December 1, 2004 it was merged with the city of Nakhodka.  Population: 

Livadiya was founded in 1941.

References

Nakhodka
Populated places established in 1941
Geography of Primorsky Krai